Qixinggang is a station on Line 1 of Chongqing Rail Transit in Chongqing Municipality, China. It is located in Yuzhong District. It opened in 2011.

Line 10 and Line 18, which are both under construction, will also serve the station in future.

Station structure

References

Yuzhong District
Railway stations in China opened in 2011
Chongqing Rail Transit stations
Railway stations in Chongqing